Yodha or yoddha may refer to:

Yodha (1991 film)
Yoddha (1992 film)
Yodha (2009 film)
Yoddha: The Warrior (2014 film)
Yodha (2022 film)
Yoddha (comics), character in Raj Comics

See also
The Yoddhas, Indian cancer organisation
UP Yoddha, Indian kabbadi team
Yoda (disambiguation)